The Shawnee News-Star is an American daily newspaper published in Shawnee, Oklahoma. It is the newspaper of record for Pottawatomie, Lincoln and Seminole counties, in the Oklahoma City metropolitan area.

It took its current name in 1943 after the merger of the Shawnee Evening Star and Shawnee Morning News. The paper was formerly owned by Stauffer Communications, which was acquired by Morris Communications in 1994. Morris sold the paper, along with thirteen others, to GateHouse Media in 2007.

References

External links

GateHouse Media

Newspapers published in Oklahoma
Pottawatomie County, Oklahoma
Publications established in 1894
Gannett publications